Gundelfingen station is a railway station in Gundelfingen in Baden-Württemberg, Germany. It lies on the Mannheim–Karlsruhe–Basel railway (Rhine Valley Railway). The Freiburg bypass, which is reserved for freight traffic, branches off south of the station. It is served by Breisgau S-Bahn (BSB) and DB Regio trains and has two side platforms. DB designates it as a class 5 station.

History
Gundelfingen station was established on 30 July 1845 with the opening of the Offenburg–Freiburg Hbf section of the Rhine Valley Railway from Mannheim to Basel via Karlsruhe.
 
The freight bypass branching off in Gundelfingen was inaugurated on 4 September 1905 to relieve traffic at Freiburg Hauptbahnhof.
 
The entire route of the Rhine Valley Railway, including Gundelfingen station, was electrified In 1955.

Operations

 
Around 100 DB Regio and Breisgau S-Bahn trains stop in Gundelfingen every day. There are direct connections to Basel, Freiburg im Breisgau, Offenburg, Karlsruhe, Waldkirch and Elzach. The municipality belongs to Regio-Verkehrsverbund Freiburg (Freiburg Regional Transport Association, RVF), which administers local services and fares.

Long-distance services
No long-distance services stop in Gundelfingen. The closest station served by long-distance traffic is Freiburg (Breisgau) Hauptbahnhof.

Local services
Gundelfingen is almost exclusively served by Breisgau S-Bahn services from Freiburg via Gundelfingen, Denzlingen and Waldkirch to Elzach every 30 to 60 minutes.
 
Regional-Express services between Offenburg and Basel as well as Regionalbahn services between Basel or Neuenburg and Offenburg, sometimes extended to/from Karlsruhe, occasionally stop in Gundelfingen.

Freight transport
Gundelfingen junction is located directly south of the station. There, the sometimes dense north-south freight traffic is routed to the Freiburg freight bypass railway.

Bus services
Bus routes 15, 16 (both Gundelfingen–Wildtal–Zähringen–Freiburg) and bus route 24 (Gundelfingen–Freiburg Industriegebiet Nord) run from Gundelfingen station. These are operated by Freiburger Verkehrs AG.  Regional buses are operated by Südbadenbus over a wider area.

References

Footnotes

Sources

Railway stations in Baden-Württemberg
Railway stations in Germany opened in 1845
1845 establishments in Baden
Buildings and structures in Breisgau-Hochschwarzwald